Froop or froops may refer to:
Froop, a German brand of fruit yogurt made by Müller (company)
Froop, a diuretic containing furosemide
Froops, fruit-flavored hard candies made by the American Candy Company